Mandavalli is a village in Krishna district of the Indian state of Andhra Pradesh.

See also 

Villages in Mandavalli mandal

References 

Villages in Krishna district
Mandal headquarters in Krishna district